Yinchuan Township may refer to these townships in China:

Yinchuan Township, Gansu, in Jishishan Bonan, Dongxiang and Salar Autonomous County, Gansu
Yinchuan Township, Heilongjiang, in Tongjiang, Heilongjiang

See also
Yinchuan, the capital city of Ningxia